Apollonaster yucatanensis is a species of abyssal sea star within the family Goniasteridae. Its distribution is within the Gulf of Mexico and Caribbean Sea, at depths of 1135.5 meters below sea level in benthic environments.

References 

Starfish described in 1970
Goniasteridae